The U.S. Senate Committee on Public Buildings and Grounds was a committee of the United States Senate from 1883 until 1946. It was preceded by the United States Congress Joint Committee on Public Buildings and Grounds and succeeded by the United States Senate Committee on Public Works.

Committee Chairpersons
1883–1887: William Mahone (RA/R-VA)
1887–1893: Leland Stanford (R-CA)
1893–1895: George Vest (D-MO)
1895–1899: Matthew S. Quay (R-PA)
1899–1905: Charles W. Fairbanks (R-IN)
1905–1911: Nathan Scott (R-WV)
1911–1913: George Sutherland (R-UT)
1913–1918: Claude A. Swanson (D-VA)
1918–1919: James A. Reed (D-MO)
1919–1926: Bert M. Fernald (R-ME)
1926–1927: Irvine L. Lenroot (R-WI)
1927–1933: Henry W. Keyes (R-NH)
1933–1942: Tom Connally (D-TX)
1942–1945: Francis Maloney (D-CT)
1945–1946: Charles O. Andrews (D-FL)51

Public Buildings and Grounds
1883 establishments in Washington, D.C.
1946 disestablishments in Washington, D.C.